Cape Hammersly is an ice-covered cape midway between Williamson Glacier and Totten Glacier on Budd Coast, Antarctica. It was delineated by G.D. Blodgett (1955) from aerial photographs taken by U.S. Navy Operation Highjump (1946–47), and named by the Advisory Committee on Antarctic Names for George W. Hammersly, a midshipman on the sloop Vincennes during the United States Exploring Expedition (1833–42) under Lieutenant Charles Wilkes.

References

Headlands of Wilkes Land